Lenore Smith (born 25 October 1958 in Balmain, Sydney, New South Wales) is an Australian actress best known for her work in television. Internationally, she is best known for her role as Kate Wellings in the drama series The Flying Doctors.

Career 
Smith studied economics as a teenager, but after being dissuaded by a teacher, she decided to take a course at Ensemble Studios in Sydney and become an actress. After being there for just over two years, Smith landed her first role in The Restless Years as Diane Archer. Smith left Australia after The Restless Years to work in London, but received a telegram asking her to return to play a role in The Flying Doctors. Smith accepted and came back to Australia to begin work on the TV series.

Lenore embarked on higher education later in life after a long and successful career as an actor in television, stage and screen. 
Lenore graduated with a Bachelor of Podiatry degree, 1st Class Honours, at Central Queensland University. Lenore is a member of the Australian Podiatry Association.

Personal life 
Lenore dated actor Patrick Ward before firstly being married to actor Gary Sweet in 1981.

She then married actor and writer Matt Kay in 1985 and they divorced in 1992. They met while a bomb alarm was going off during the stage musical Cats.

Smith married former E Street actor Warren Jones on 19 October 1997.

Filmography 

FILM

TELEVISION

References

External links 

1958 births
Living people
Australian television actresses